Gayler is a surname. Notable people with the surname include: 

Di Gayler (born 1948), Australian politician
Herbert Gayler (1881–1917), British cyclist
John Gayler (born 1943), Australian politician
Noel Gayler (1914–2011), American admiral
Wolfgang Gayler (1934–2011), German conductor and pianist